UPCI can refer to:

United Pentecostal Church International
University of Pittsburgh Cancer Institute
Universidad Peruana de Ciencias e Informática, a university in Lima, Peru
United Provinces of Central Italy